The Lurgan Mail was founded in 1889 by Lewis Robert Richardson. The Lurgan Mail is a tabloid weekly newspaper based in Lurgan, County Armagh in Northern Ireland. It is published on Wednesday evenings, though each edition always bears the Thursday date and reports not only news in Lurgan, but also in nearby towns such as Waringstown and others in  Craigavon Borough area. It is operated by Johnston Publishing (NI), a holding company of Johnston Press, who owns many of titles across Ireland and the United Kingdom.

References

External links
Lurgan Mail

Newspapers published in Northern Ireland
Mass media in County Armagh
Lurgan
Newspapers published by Johnston Press